Inge Walthemate is a retired West German slalom canoeist who competed in the late 1950s. She won two medals at the ICF Canoe Slalom World Championships with a silver in 1957 (Folding K-1 team) and a bronze in 1959 (Folding K-1).

References

West German female canoeists
Living people
Year of birth missing (living people)
Medalists at the ICF Canoe Slalom World Championships